This is a list of electoral results for the Koonung Province in Victorian state elections.

Members for Koonung Province

Election results

Elections in the 2000s

Elections in the 1990s

References

Victoria (Australia) state electoral results by district